Prestwich was a constituency in the county of Lancashire of the House of Commons for the Parliament of the United Kingdom. Created by the Redistribution of Seats Act 1885, it was represented by one Member of Parliament. The constituency was abolished in 1918.

Boundaries
The constituency of South-East Lancashire, Prestwich Division was created by the Redistribution of Seats Act 1885, with the official title. It consisted of an area of the parliamentary county of Lancashire between the boroughs of Salford and Oldham. It consisted of the following civil parishes and townships:
Blackley
Chadderton
Crompton
Crumpsall
Droylsden
Failsworth
Great Heaton
Little Heaton
Moston
Prestwich
Royton
And the part of the parish of Ashton-under-Lyne not included in the municipal borough.

The electorate also consisted of the freeholders of the municipal boroughs of Ashton-under-Lyne and Oldham who were entitled to vote in the county.

Abolition
The constituency was abolished by the Representation of the People Act 1918, with its area divided between four new constuencies:
Blackley, Crumpsall, and Moston (which had been added to the City of Manchester in 1890) became the Parliamentary Borough of Manchester Blackley.
Chadderton, Great Heaton, Little Heaton and Prestwich became part of Middleton and Prestwich Division
Droylsden and Failsworth were included in Mossley Division
Crompton and Royton, along with five other urban districts, formed Royton Division.

Members of Parliament

Elections

Elections in the 1880s

Elections in the 1890s

Elections in the 1900s

Elections in the 1910s

General Election 1914–15:

Another General Election was required to take place before the end of 1915. The political parties had been making preparations for an election to take place and by the July 1914, the following candidates had been selected; 
Liberal: Frederick Cawley
Unionist: Frederick Brocklehurst

See also
Prestwich-cum-Oldham

References

External links

Parliamentary constituencies in North West England (historic)
Constituencies of the Parliament of the United Kingdom established in 1885
Constituencies of the Parliament of the United Kingdom disestablished in 1918
Prestwich